Henrik Sven Hirdman (Swedish pronunciation: [hẹn:rik sveːn hiːrdmaːn]), born 28 September 1939 in Stavanger, Norway, is a Swedish diplomat and ambassador.

Biography

After military service at the Swedish Army Language School in 1958, Sven Hirdman went to Uppsala University for studies in Slavic languages and a Master of Social Sciences, with International Relations as the major field of study.

In the years 1963–1994, Sven Hirdman served in the Ministry for Foreign Affairs. He served as ambassador in Moscow and Tel Aviv and earlier as embassy official in London and Beijing.

In time chronology, Hirdman was deputy director of the Stockholm International Peace Research Institute (SIPRI) from 1969 until 1972; Embassy Counsellor in Beijing from 1972 to 1976; Head of Division in the Ministry of Foreign Affairs from 1976 to 1979; State Secretary in the Ministry of Defence from 1979 to 1982; Ambassador in Tel Aviv and Nicosia from 1983 to 1987; War Materials Inspector and head of the National Swedish War Materials Inspectorate from 1987 to 1994. Between 1994 and 2004 he was Sweden's Ambassador in Moscow, and in the four last years also the Dean (Doyen) of the Diplomatic Corps there. During his service in Moscow  Hirdman was simultaneously accredited as ambassador to Belarus, Georgia, Armenia, Azerbaijan, Kazakhstan, Kyrgyzstan, Uzbekistan, Tajikistan and Turkmenistan.

Sven Hirdman was part of the Swedish chapter of Transparency International between the years 2008 and 2009 chairman, and between the years 2005 and 2011 Marshal of the Diplomatic Corps at the Foreign Ministry. Since 1990 he is member of the Royal Swedish Academy of War Sciences. He has also had assignments for industry.

As an active participant in the security policy debate in Sweden Sven Hirdman is often engaged as a lecturer around the country. He is against Swedish membership in NATO, and published in October 2015 the book Ryssland och svensk säkerhetspolitik - 50 år i utrikespolitisk tjänst (Russia and Swedish Security Policy - 50 years in foreign policy service).

Family 
Sven Hirdman and his wife Marianne Ljungqvist have three daughters, Annika, Viveka and Tonika.

Sven Hirdman's mother and father were Charlotte Schledt (1906-1966) and Einar Hirdman (1916-1999). Hirdman's grandparents on the mother's side were the Swiss Emélie and the German Fritz Schledt, and Swedish Gunnar and Maj Hirdman on the father's side. Eili and Yvonne Hirdman are sisters to Sven Hirdman. In August 2010 Yvonne Hirdman published a prized book entitled Den röda grevinnan (The Red Countess) about their mother Charlotte.

References

1939 births
Living people
Ambassadors of Sweden to Israel
Ambassadors of Sweden to Cyprus
Ambassadors of Sweden to Russia